Knights and Magick is a role-playing game published by Heritage USA in 1980.

Description
Knights and Magick is a fantasy/medieval miniatures system designed for mass or single combat, in individual battles or large political-economic-military campaigns. The game includes rudimentary role-playing rules, magic spells, and guidelines for use with other RPGs.

Publication history
The Knights and Magick Rules Set was designed by Arnold Hendrick and published by Heritage USA in 1980 as a boxed set containing three 48-page books and a 32-page book, a digest-sized 16-page pamphlet, and a reference sheet.

Reception
Aaron Allston reviewed Knights & Magick in The Space Gamer No. 35. Allston commented that "Overall, I would guardedly recommend Knights & Magick, but not to straight FRP gamers; they would find little of use. Fantasy and historical miniatures gamers will find some innovation and a good deal of resource material."

Lawrence Schick felt that the game was "Designed mainly to sell Heritage miniatures".

Reviews
Pegasus #1 (April/May, 1981)

References

Fantasy role-playing games
Heritage Models games
Role-playing games introduced in 1980